Sarah Phillips may refer to:
Sarah Phillips (cyclist) (born 1967), British cyclist
Sarah Phillips (fashion designer), American fashion designer
Sarah Phillips (novel), 1984 book by Andrea Lee
Sarah Phillips (singer), British singer